Kristin Hjellegjerde is a curator and gallerist, born in Minnesund, Norway and now based in London.

Biography 
Hjellegjerde completed her BA in literature, criminology and Ideas of History at the University of Oslo. After completing her degree, Hjellegjerde moved to Italy and lived in Bangkok, Singapore and New York where she later continued her studies at Herbert Berghof studio in New York City.  After completing her education there, Kristin Hjellegjerde wrote and directed plays in Los Angeles. 
During her time in New York, she worked as a real estate agent, selling properties on the Upper West Side of New York. Later, Hjellegjerde completed an Art and Business course at the New York University after which she moved to London and opened her first gallery space in 2012.  At the moment, Kristin Hjellegjerde has four gallery locations, two spaces in London, United Kingdom, one in Nevlunghavn, Norway, and one in Berlin, Germany.

Kristin Hjellegjerde gallery is a rapidly growing gallery whose focus lies in international contemporary art. Following her first gallery space in Wandsworth, London, Hjellegjerde opened her second location in London, a space in Berlin, Germany, and recently another location in Nevlunghavn, Norway. The gallery represents a diverse and distinct programme, primarily displaying paintings, works on paper and sculpture, but also installation and video art.  It represents global artists, both emerging and established, with a strong aesthetical and conceptual foundation.

Apart from curating shows for her own gallery, Kristin Hjellegjerde actively curates exhibitions outside of her gallery spaces.  In 2019, Hjellegjerde curated KUBATANA: An Exhibition of Contemporary African artists at Vestfossen Kunstlaboratorium in Oslo, Norway.  The exhibition brought together works of 33 artists from 18 of Africa's 54 countries and filled all four floors of the museum, becoming one of the most expansive and inclusive exhibitions of African art in Scandinavia up to this day.  Works included a wide variety of mediums, spanning from painting, installation, video, performance to sculpture and photography. Artworks on display also ranged through various periods, exhibiting works from 1970s photography to today's video art. The artworks focused on subjects rooted in personal histories as well as in collective mythologies, colonial past, and contemporary social issues.

References

External links 
 Kristin Hjellegjerde Gallery Website

Year of birth missing (living people)
Living people
University of Oslo alumni
Norwegian curators
Norwegian expatriates in the United Kingdom
Norwegian women curators